The Ride is the second studio album by Welsh indie rock band Catfish and the Bottlemen. It was released on 27 May 2016 through Island Records and Capitol Records. The album was produced by Dave Sardy, who has previously worked with bands such as Oasis, Jet and Wolfmother. The Ride became the band's first UK no.1 album and was promoted by four singles; "Soundcheck", "7", "Twice" and "Outside", the second of which became the band's highest charting UK single at the time. The album received generally mixed reviews upon release.

Track listing
Lyrics by Van McCann and music by Catfish and the Bottlemen.

Personnel
Credits adapted from The Ride liner notes.

Catfish and the Bottlemen
Van McCann – vocals, guitar
Johnny Bond – guitar
Benji Blakeway – bass
Bob Hall – drums

Production
Dave Sardy - production, mixing
Jordan Curtis Hughes - photography
Tim Lahan - artwork

Charts and certifications

Weekly charts

Year-end charts

Certifications

References

2016 albums
Catfish and the Bottlemen albums
Albums produced by Dave Sardy
Capitol Records albums